Escaping Eritrea is a 2021 English documentary episode produced and directed by Evan Williams. The co-producers are Daffodil Altan, Priyanka Boghani, Daniel Edge, Max Green, Erika Howard, Michelle Mizner and Evan Williams. The real footage was taken by Michael, who was also a refugee from Eritrea who moved to Europe. He put the camera in a jacket pocket with a hole and began filming what was going on around him.

The documentary based on the refugee crisis between 2015 and 2016 occurred across the Mediterranean where large groups coming across into Europe from Eritrea. It took five years for the investigations and some secretly documented footage inside a prison also included in the documentary. It made its television premier on 4 May 2021 on PBS through Frontline in United States and later telecast in Channel 4 in the United Kingdom.

Cast
 Isias Afwerki - President of Eritrea (archive footage)
 Priyanka Boghani - Reporter
 Sarah Childress - Reporter
 Yemane Gebreab - Adviser to president of Eritrea (archive footage)
 Sheila B. Keetharuth - Former U.N. Special Rapporteur on Human Rights in Eritrea
 Sophie Okonedo - Narrator (voice)
 Mike Smith - Chair Commission of Inquiry on Human Rights in Eritrea (archive footage)
 Hanna Petros Solomon - Eritrean refugee and activist
 Evan Williams - Reporter
 Judy Woodruff
 Katie Worth - Reporter

References

External links 
 

2021 films
2021 documentary films
American documentary television films
2020s American films

Accolades
2021 Peabody Award Winner